Rune Almenning Jarstein (born 29 September 1984) is a Norwegian professional footballer who plays as a goalkeeper for Bundesliga club Hertha BSC and the Norway national team.

Club career

Early career
Jarstein was born in Porsgrunn. He started his career playing for local team Herkules in Skien. During his teens, he had trials at several European top clubs, including Manchester United and Bayern Munich.

Jarstein made his debut in the Norwegian top division, aged 18, playing for Odd in 2002. In 2007, after Odd Grenland had been relegated to the Norwegian First Division, he was transferred to Rosenborg.

On 8 March 2010, Jarstein signed for Viking, after losing his starting position to Daniel Örlund. His contract with Viking expired after the 2013 season.

Hertha BSC

On 17 December 2013, he signed a two-year contract for German club Hertha BSC. Throughout the 2015–16 season, he was the first-choice goalkeeper as Thomas Kraft was injured after sustaining a shoulder injury. This gave second-choice goalkeeper Jarstein the chance to show his ability, and he took the keeper spot for the rest of the season. On 18 December 2015, after his successful spell, he was rewarded with a contract extension of three and a half years at Hertha to the end of the 2018–19 season.

Jarstein remained Hertha's first choice goalkeeper over Kraft. Only during the UEFA Europa League qualification round, did Kraft and Jarstein switch positions, with Jarstein in goal for the home leg and Kraft in goal for the away leg. In an away match against Borussia Dortmund, Jarstein's performance was met with high praise after several outstanding saves and after saving a penalty from Dortmund striker Pierre-Emerick Aubameyang, earning Hertha a point with a 1–1 draw.

On 12 April 2018, Jarstein signed a new deal keeping him at the club beyond 2019 when his current contract was about to expire. On the opening day of the 2018–19 season, Jarstein saved an 83rd minute penalty from Mikael Ishak, in a 1–0 win over 1. FC Nürnberg.

Ahead of the 2020–21 season, Alexander Schwolow was signed as the new starter in goal under head coach Bruno Labbadia. When manager Pál Dárdai returned to relegation-threatened Hertha in January 2021, Jarstein returned in goal. He played eight league games before sidelined in April 2021 after contracting COVID-19, which required medical treatment in a hospital.

International career
Jarstein was capped 30 times at youth level for Norway.

On 23 August 2007, he made his debut for the Norway national team, playing 45 minutes in a 2–1 win over Argentina. When Jon Knudsen was injured in 2011, Jarstein became the new first-choice goalkeeper at the national team, and was the first choice until the 2014 FIFA World Cup qualification started in September 2012, when Espen Bugge Pettersen played the match against Iceland. Jarstein was however back in the starting line-up in the next match against Slovenia, and in January 2013 the goalkeeper coach on the national team Frode Grodås stated that Jarstein was the first-choice goalkeeper.

Career statistics

Club

1.Includes Norwegian Cup and German Cup.
2.Includes UEFA Europa League and UEFA Intertoto Cup.

International

Honours
Rosenborg
 Tippeligaen: 2009
 Superfinalen: 2010

Individual
 Gullballen: 2018

References

External links

Profile at the Hertha BSC website
Profile at RBKweb.no

1984 births
Living people
Sportspeople from Porsgrunn
Norwegian footballers
Norway international footballers
Association football goalkeepers
Odds BK players
Rosenborg BK players
Viking FK players
Hertha BSC players
Eliteserien players
Bundesliga players
Norwegian expatriate footballers
Expatriate footballers in Germany
Norwegian expatriate sportspeople in Germany